Lincoln Township is a township in Grundy County, in the U.S. state of Missouri.

Lincoln Township was established in 1872, most likely taking its name from President Abraham Lincoln.

References

Townships in Missouri
Townships in Grundy County, Missouri